E-Side is the debut English-language extended play (EP) (second overall) by Japanese duo Yoasobi. It was released digitally on November 12, 2021, through Sony Music Entertainment Japan. It consists of performances of eight tracks from the duo's songs in the English language, including their previous-release singles "Into the Night", "RGB", "Monster", and "Blue". Konnie Aoki is in charge of translating all tracks into English. Commercially, E-Side debuted at number 19 on the Oricon Combined Albums Chart and number nine on the Billboard Japan Hot Albums.

Background

Yoasobi released their first English-language song, titled "Into the Night" on July 2, 2021, which was translated from the duo's "Yoru ni Kakeru" by Konnie Aoki. It was peaked at number 44 on the Oricon Combined Singles Chart, and number two on the Digital Singles Chart. Later, they also released "RGB" from "Sangenshoku" on July 16, "Monster" from "Kaibutsu" on July 30, and "Blue" from "Gunjō" on October 29, the same day as E-Side announcement. All tracks debuted on the Oricon Digital Singles Chart at number ten, eleven, and thirteen, respectively.

The duo revealed on their radio show,  that the EP title E-Side was decided by Nippon Broadcasting System. According to Paper interview, Ayase stated the EP that Yoasobi did not change anything and try to appeal to overseas. They just extract and give the duo's essence to new fans in a new language, but still similar at its core. In a Nylon interview in February 2022, Yoasobi said that they take into consideration the sound structure to choose the songs to make an English version. The songs they chose should not interfere with the original and still would be able to be understood in English.

Release and promotion

Yoasobi announced their first English-language EP, titled E-Side on October 29, 2021, the same day as "Blue" release, alongside its track listing, and cover artwork, scheduled for release on November 12 to digital music and streaming platforms only, as part of "Yoasobi Nice to Meet You Countdown" to announce the duo's new information every Friday for ten weeks until their one-off concert Nice to Meet You. The cover artwork of E-Side depicts a red pixel art on the bottom of the gray background with darker gray pixels and places the duo's slogan "Novel into Music" below the EP's title, designed by Mina Sakurai.

The EP contains four previous-release English songs, and four new English-translated songs: "Haven't" from "Tabun", "Comet" from "Yasashii Suisei, "Encore", and "Tracing a Dream" from "Ano Yume o Nazotte". The duo uploaded the EP's snippets as the "crossfade movie" on November 7. The full song of "Comet", and "Tracing a Dream" were played for the first time at their radio show Yoasobi's All Night Nippon X on November 10, due to asking fans via Twitter poll. The accompanying music videos of the all new tracks were premiered alongside the EP release since midnight JST. LED billboards for advertising the EP were also placed in New York City, the United States.

Commercial performance

In Japan, E-Side entered the Oricon Combined Albums Chart at number 19 and debuted atop the Digital Albums Chart, selling 3,305 units. The EP entered Billboard Japan Hot Albums at number nine. It opened with 2,847 digital sales, charting number two on the Download Albums, behind only Silk Sonic's An Evening with Silk Sonic, which debuted atop with 2,891 digital sales.

Track listing

Notes

 All tracks are noted as "English version" in some music streaming services.

Credits and personnel

Credits adapted from the official website.

 Ayase – songwriter, producer
 Ikura – vocals
 Konnie Aoki – English translation

Charts

Weekly charts

Year-end charts

Sales

Release history

References

2021 EPs
English-language Japanese albums
Sony Music Entertainment Japan EPs
Yoasobi EPs